Albina Kamaletdinova (born January 24, 1969) is an athlete from Tajikistan who competes in archery.

2008 Summer Olympics
At the 2008 Summer Olympics in Beijing Kamaletdinova finished her ranking round with a total of 547 points. This gave her the 63rd seed for the final competition bracket in which she faced Yun Ok-Hee in the first round. The archer from South Korea was too strong and won the confrontation with 109-102, eliminating Kamaletdinova straight away. Yun would eventually go on to win the bronze medal.

References

External links

1969 births
Living people
Olympic archers of Tajikistan
Archers at the 2008 Summer Olympics
Tajikistani female archers